Kenneth Daucke Andersen (also known as Kenneth Daucke) is a Danish curler.

At the national level, he is a two-time Danish men's champion curler (2004, 2005) and a 2003 Danish mixed champion curler.

Teams

Men's

Mixed

References

External links

Living people
Danish male curlers
Danish curling champions
Year of birth missing (living people)
Place of birth missing (living people)